Carlo Felice Cillario (7 February 191513 December 2007) was an Argentinian-born Italian conductor of international renown.

Biography
Born Carlos Felix Cillario in San Rafael, Mendoza, Argentina, he went to Italy in 1923, where he studied the violin and composition at the Bologna Conservatorio. He hoped to become a soloist but a wrist injury playing soccer made him turn to conducting. He made his conducting debut in 1942 in Odessa. During the war, he returned to Argentina, where he conducted the Symphonic Orchestra of the University of Tucuman.

Upon his return to Italy, he founded the Bologna Chamber Orchestra in 1946, and reserved a major portion of his time to opera, conducting at the opera houses of Rome, Turin, Florence, Milan, etc. He quickly began appearing outside Italy, notably in Athens, Berlin, Oslo and Paris.

The year 1961 saw his debuts in England, at the Glyndebourne Festival in L'elisir d'amore, and in the United States, at the Lyric Opera of Chicago in La Forza del Destino, later conducting The Barber of Seville, La Cenerentola, La favorite and La bohème. In 1964, he made his debut at the Royal Opera House in London at the request of Maria Callas, conducting her now famous series of Tosca performances with Tito Gobbi. Debuts at the San Francisco Opera followed in 1970 (Tosca) and at the Metropolitan Opera in New York in 1972 (La sonnambula).

He became one of the favorite conductors of Montserrat Caballé, conducting at her Covent Garden debut in 1972 (La traviata with Nicolai Gedda and Victor Braun), in a London concert performance of Caterina Cornaro, and shortly after in an RCA studio recording of Norma.

Carlo began conducting seasonally in Australia in 1968, working with the Australian Opera (now Opera Australia) at the Sydney Opera House, becoming principal guest conductor in 1988, before retiring in 2003; leaving behind a legacy of musicianship and phrasing evident in his surviving music scores at the Opera Australia library.

Carlo Felice Cilliaro stands as one of the most singer-friendly of all conductors, a reassuring and solid presence both in the opera house and in the recording studio.

He died in 2007, in Bologna, Italy.

Cillario's conducting style is demonstrated in three rare conductor-cam videos on YouTube, performed in the Sydney Opera House Pit, Joan Sutherland Theatre, of Opera Australia productions:

https://www.youtube.com/watch?v=aOq2ECtbV9w
Macbeth Prelude, (Verdi) 1996 production

https://www.youtube.com/watch?v=nc-aZn6ZSQE
playout to Act 1 from Turandot, Puccini 1999 production

https://www.youtube.com/watch?v=VivSO6C8Msc
from the opening of Act 1, Boheme, Puccini  1996 production

Notes

Sources
 Elizabeth Forbes, 'Carlo Felice Cillario: Opera Conductor', The Independent 24 December 2007. 
 'Carlo Cillario' (Obituary), The Daily Telegraph 21 December 2007.

External links
Interview with Carlo Felice Cillario, November 8, 1982

1915 births
2007 deaths
Italian male conductors (music)
20th-century Italian conductors (music)
Argentine emigrants to Italy
20th-century Italian male musicians